"Looking At Me (J'aime regarder)" is a song by Belgian DJ Laurent Wéry & Sir-G, from his debut album Ready for the Night. The song was written by Serge Ramaekers, Chantal Kashala, Laurent Wery, Christophe Baggerman. It was released in Belgium as a digital download on 8 July 2009.

Track listing
 Digital download
 "Looking At Me (J'aime regarder)" (Radio Mix) - 3:18
 "Looking At Me (J'aime regarder)" (Extended Mix) - 5:31

Credits and personnel
Producers – Serge Ramaekers, Laurent Wery
Lyrics – Serge Ramaekers, Chantal Kashala, Laurent Wery, Christophe Baggerman
Label: La Musique du Beau Monde

Chart performance

Release history

References

External links
 Official Website
 Laurent Wery on Facebook

2009 singles
Laurent Wéry songs
2009 songs
Songs written by Laurent Wéry